The Makings of a Man is the fourth studio album by Jaheim. It was released by Divine Mill Records and Atlantic Records on December 18, 2007 in the United States. The album debuted at number 11 on the US Billboard 200 with first week sales of 176,000 copies. The Makings of a Man has been certified Gold by the Recording Industry Association of America (RIAA). It has now sold over 500,000 copies since its release.

Track listing

Charts

Weekly charts

Year-end charts

Certifications

References

2007 albums
Jaheim albums